Coleford is a small hamlet in Mid-Devon, England. It includes a pub, The New Inn with their resident parrot of over 40 years Captain, and also has a park.

History
Charles I came through Coleford on 27 July 1644 on his way to Bow, where he spent a night during the English Civil War. At that time Coleford village was on the main highway from Cornwall to Devon. There is a tradition that the King reviewed his horse troop, from the "Porched House", a building which dates from this time.

Henry Kingsley's novel The Recollections of Geoffry Hamlyn is set partly in the village.

References

External links

Villages in Devon